"Into the Light" is an English language hit single by Lebanese-German singer Fady Maalouf. Maalouf was a contestant in 2008 of Deutschland sucht den Superstar, the German version of Pop Idol.

It is the first single taken from the 2010 album of the same name Into the Light. Upon release it charted in German Singles Chart reaching #44 in the German Singles Chart and #72 in the Austrian Singles Chart.

Track list
"Into the Light" (Album version)
"Into the Light" (Extended Club Mix)

Chart performance

References

2010 singles
Fady Maalouf songs
2010 songs
Columbia Records singles
Songs written by Ivo Moring